The 2015 Kansas Jayhawks baseball team represented the University of Kansas during the 2015 NCAA Division I baseball season. The Jayhawks played their home games at Hoglund Ballpark as a member of the Big 12 Conference. They were led by head coach Ritch Price, in his 13th season at Kansas.

Previous season
In 2014, the Jayhawks finished the season 3rd in the Big 12 with a record of 36–26, 15–9 in conference play. They qualified for the 2014 Big 12 Conference baseball tournament, and were eliminated in the first round. They qualified for the 2014 NCAA Division I baseball tournament, and were placed in the Louisville Regional, with the host Louisville Cardinals, Kentucky, and Kent State. In their opening game, the Jayhawks defeated Kentucky, 10–6, but then fell to Louisville by a score of 3–6. In the loser's bracket, the Wildcats got revenge and defeated the Jayhawks, 8–6, to eliminate Kansas from the tournament.

Personnel

Roster

Coaching staff

Schedule

References

Kansas Jayhawks
Kansas Jayhawks baseball seasons
Kansas Jay